Piski  is a village in the administrative district of Gmina Czerwin, within Ostrołęka County, Masovian Voivodeship, in east-central Poland.

References

Piski
Łomża Governorate
Białystok Voivodeship (1919–1939)
Warsaw Voivodeship (1919–1939)
Belastok Region